Tom Walsh (born April 16, 1949) is a former American football coach.  Walsh is best known for his two stints as offensive coordinator for the Los Angeles and Oakland Raiders.

Early career
Walsh entered coaching in 1978 as the coach of Rubidoux High School in Jurupa Valley, California. In 1979 he moved up to the college ranks as the head coach of United States International before becoming the offensive coordinator  and quarterbacks coach of Murray State in 1980. In 1981 he was brought on as the offensive coordinator and quarterbacks coach of Cincinnati.

Los Angeles Raiders
In 1982 he was hired as the quarterbacks and wide receivers coach of the newly relocated Los Angeles Raiders under head coach Tom Flores. Under Flores he was part of the coaching staff that won Super Bowl XVIII. In 1991 Walsh became offensive coordinator under head coach Art Shell. After several disputes with players over his coaching style and an alleged fight offensive line coach Bill Meyers during the 1994 season Walsh was fired along with Shell after the 1994 season.

Return to college coaching
After being fired from the Raiders, Walsh went on to coach the Idaho State Bengals in 1997 and 1998, compiling a 6–16 record. He then coached the Mobile Admirals to the league championship of the short-lived professional Regional Football League in 1999. After 1999, Walsh was all but retired from coaching.

Out of football
Walsh spent the years out of coaching operating a bed and breakfast in Swan Valley, Idaho. He also served as the town's mayor.

Oakland Raiders
After five years out of football and twelve out of the NFL, Walsh was re-hired by the Oakland Raiders in February, 2006, as offensive coordinator by head coach Art Shell but demoted before the end of the 2006 season which resulted in a 2–14 record and replaced by John Shoop.  During the time Walsh was the offensive coordinator for the 2006 Raiders his offense was referred to as the "Bed and Breakfast Offense". After leaving the Raiders, Walsh stated that Randy Moss, whom he coached in Oakland, was "a player whose skills are diminishing."  Moss went on to break the single season touchdown reception record in 2007 after being traded to the New England Patriots.

Head coaching record

College

References

Jurupa Valley, California
1949 births
Living people
Cincinnati Bearcats football coaches
Idaho State Bengals football coaches
High school football coaches in California
Mayors of places in Idaho
Murray State Racers football coaches
Los Angeles Raiders coaches
National Football League offensive coordinators
Oakland Raiders coaches
San Diego State University alumni
San Diego Toreros football coaches
United States International Gulls football coaches
University of California, Santa Barbara alumni
People from Bonneville County, Idaho
Sportspeople from Vallejo, California